The Scottish Building Society is a building society based in Edinburgh, Scotland. It is the oldest building society in the world, the only independent building society based in Scotland and the 25th largest in the United Kingdom based on total assets of £431.4 million at 31 January 2020. It is a member of the Building Societies Association.

The Society has five branches in Aberdeen, Edinburgh, Galashiels, Glasgow, Inverness and Troon, as well as a network of agents throughout Scotland.

History
The Scottish Building Society was established in 1848 as the Edinburgh Property Investment Company. It changed its name to the Scottish Building Society in 1929.

On 1 February 2013, the Scottish Building Society merged with its Edinburgh competitor Century Building Society. As a result of the merger, it became the only remaining building society to be headquartered in Scotland.

References

External links
Scottish Building Society

Building societies of the United Kingdom
British companies established in 1848
Banks established in 1848
Organizations established in 1848
Companies based in Edinburgh
1848 establishments in Scotland